Atlantirivulus is a genus of fishes in the family Rivulidae. They are endemic to shallow swamps, creeks, streams and pools in the Atlantic Forest in southeastern Brazil, ranging from Rio de Janeiro to Santa Catarina. Several of the species are highly threatened, while others survive in well-protected reserves. A. janeiroensis was initially feared extinct, but has since been rediscovered in two reserves.

Similar to closely related genera such as Anablepsoides, Cynodonichthys, Laimosemion and Melanorivulus, Atlantirivulus are non-annual killifish.

Compared to many species in the family, the colors of Atlantirivulus are relatively dull.

Species
Until 2011, Atlantirivulus were included in Rivulus, and some prefer to maintain them in that genus.

If recognized as a valid genus, there are currently 15 species in Atlantirivulus:

 Atlantirivulus depressus W. J. E. M. Costa, 1991
 Atlantirivulus guanabarensis W. J. E. M. Costa, 2014
 Atlantirivulus haraldsiolii Berkenkamp, 1984
 Atlantirivulus janeiroensis W. J. E. M. Costa, 1991
 Atlantirivulus jurubatibensis W. J. E. M. Costa, 2008
 Atlantirivulus lazzarotoi W. J. E. M. Costa, 2007
 Atlantirivulus luelingi Seegers, 1984
 Atlantirivulus maricensis W. J. E. M. Costa, 2014
 Atlantirivulus nudiventris W. J. E. M. Costa & G. C. Brasil, 1991
 Atlantirivulus paranaguensis W. J. E. M. Costa, 2014
 Atlantirivulus ribeirensis W. J. E. M. Costa, 2014
 Atlantirivulus riograndensis W. J. E. M. Costa & Lanés, 2009
 Atlantirivulus santensis Köhler, 1906
 Atlantirivulus simplicis W. J. E. M. Costa, 2004
 Atlantirivulus unaensis W. J. E. M. Costa & De Luca, 2009

References

Rivulidae
Freshwater fish genera